Li Daqiu (born October 1953) a former politician in the Guangxi Zhuang Autonomous Region of China. Li served as the Party Secretary of Hezhou, and the Mayor of Yulin, both cities in Guangxi. He was removed from his posts and expelled from the Communist Party in 2013 and subsequently tried on charges of corruption. In October 2014, Li was convicted of taking bribes of 10.95 million Yuan (~$1.8 million) between 2003 and 2013, and sentenced to fifteen years in prison.

Career
Li was born in Zhaoping County, Guangxi in October 1953.

Li joined the Chinese Communist Party in October 1973 and he got involved in politics in October 1974.

During the Cultural Revolution, Li worked in Zhaoping County as a local officer. He rose through the ranks to become the Vice-Governor of Zhaoping County in November 1987, then he was elevated to the County Governor and the CCP County Committee Vice-Secretary of Zhaoping.

In September 1993 he became the CCP County Committee Secretary of He County, a position he held until April 1996.

Li entered Central Party School of the Chinese Communist Party in August 1995, majoring in economic administration, where he graduated in 1999. After graduation, he  was educated in Zhongnan University of Economics and Law.

In June 2001, he was appointed the Mayor of the city of Yulin, Guangxi and the Party Vice-Secretary of Yulin, he remained in that position until May 2003, when he was transferred to Hezhou and appointed the Party Secretary of Hezhou.

In January 2008, Li was elevated to the Vice-Chairman of the Guangxi Committee of the Chinese People's Political Consultative Conference.

Downfall
On July 6, 2013, state media announced that Li was being investigated by the Central Commission for Discipline Inspection for "serious violations of laws and regulations". On July 13, Li was dismissed from his position. In September 2013, Li was expelled from the Chinese Communist Party and removed from his government posts.

On August 28, 2014, Li's case was brought before the intermediate court of the Yanbian Korean Autonomous Prefecture in Jilin province for trial. The prefecture's prosecutor agency alleged that Li took 10.95 million Yuan (~$1.8 million) in bribes during his time as Hezhou party chief and Vice-Chairman of the Guangxi Committee of the Chinese People's Political Consultative Conference, in the process of government business dealings as well as in the arrangement of promotions for officials. On October 13, Li was sentenced to fifteen years in prison.

Li is the highest-ranked official to be convicted of corruption charges in Guangxi since the 18th Party Congress. His downfall has earned him the moniker "Guangxi tiger", in reference to Xi Jinping's anti-corruption programme that vowed to take down "tigers" (high-level officials) and "flies" (petty officials).

References

1953 births
Living people
Chinese politicians convicted of corruption
Expelled members of the Chinese Communist Party
People's Republic of China politicians from Guangxi
Chinese Communist Party politicians from Guangxi